Club Gimnàstic de Tarragona, commonly known as Gimnàstic Tarragona or sometimes just Nàstic, is a Spanish sports club based in Tarragona, in the autonomous community of Catalonia. Its football team plays in Primera División RFEF – Group 2.

The club was founded in 1886 and is one of the oldest football clubs in Spain. It has teams competing in athletics, basketball, tennis, gymnastics, table tennis and futsal, but a football team was not formed until 1914. The team enjoyed a three-year La Liga spell in its beginnings (1947–50).

Since 1972, the team has played home games at Nou Estadi, which seats 14,591 spectators.

History
The club was founded on 1 March 1886 by a group of fifteen people who met at the Cafè del Centre on Rambla Nova. The majority of the club's early members belonged to the upper middle class and, as the club name suggests, was initially founded to promote gymnastics. Later the club members began to organise fencing, hiking, boxing and cycling. In 1914, the club absorbed a local football club called the Club Olímpic de Tarragona and consequently formed its own football team using the former colours of Olímpic: red, white and black. In those days the team played home matches in the Avenida Catalunya stadium.

In January 1918, Gimnàstic made its debut as a football team in the Campionat de Catalunya and by 1927 were crowned champions in the second division. In the 1943–44 season the team appeared in the Tercera División and in the following season moved up to the Segunda División.

In the 1946–47 season Nàstic finished second in the second division and entered the La Liga. In 1947 it also reached the Copa del Generalísimo semi-final but lost to the RCD Espanyol, having beaten the FC Barcelona in the previous round.

The team finished its debut first division season in seventh place, with the highlight of the season coming on 11 January 1948 with a 3–1 win against the Real Madrid at the Bernabéu, thus becoming the first team ever to do so. The club played two further seasons in the top level, being relegated in 1949–50 after losing a play-off to the CD Alcoyano. The team moved to the new Nou Estadi in 1972.

Fifty-six years later, for the 2006–07 season, Gimnàstic returned to the top flight. Along with coach Luis César Sampedro, some of the players responsible for the promotion included veterans Antonio Pinilla and Albano Bizarri. Rubén Castro, Ariza Makukula and Javier Portillo (eventually the team's top scorer) were also brought in. The club was placed in the relegation zone for 33 of the 38 rounds, eventually dropping down a division. Sampedro was replaced mid-season by Paco Flores who improved the team's numbers. In the middle of 2007 the club was crowned the Copa Catalunya champions after a 2–1 win over FC Barcelona, with goals from Pinilla and Tati Maldonado.

After returning to the second level Gimnàstic achieved a mid-table position in 2007–08 and 2008–09 with César Ferrando in charge of the team. However, in the 2009–10 and 2010–11 seasons, the club only managed to rank one position above the relegation zone. In the 2011–12 campaign the team was relegated to the Segunda División B after only winning six games out of 42.

On 12 September 2012 Nàstic won the second Catalan Cup in its history, after defeating the AEC Manlleu with an Eugeni goal. In the 2014–15 campaign, after finishing first in its group, the club returned to the second level after defeating the SD Huesca in the play-offs.

In the 2018–19 campaign the team was relegated to the Segunda División B ending a four-year run in the second division.

Supporters
There are two small ultras groups: a right-wing political group called Ultras Tarraco and an antifa group called Nàstic Crew.

Seasons

Season to season

4 seasons in La Liga
22 seasons in Segunda División
2 seasons in Primera División RFEF
28 seasons in Segunda División B
25 seasons in Tercera División
3 seasons in Categorías Regionales

Players

Current squad
The numbers are established according to the official website:www.gimnasticdetarragona.com and www.lfp.es
.

Reserve team

Out on loan

Current technical staff

Notable players
Players who appeared in more than 100 league matches for the club and/or reached international status.

Player records
Most appearances - 528, Santi Coch
Most goals - 181, Valero Serer

Honours

Copa Catalunya: 2007–08, 2011–12, 2016–17
Segunda División B: 1996–97
Tercera División: 1944–45, 1954–55, 1960–61, 1965–66, 1966–67, 1971–72, 1977–78
Catalan Cup Second Division: 1926–27
Segunda División B League Cup: 1983–84

Affiliated clubs

 CF Pobla de Mafumet
 Kitchee SC
 C.D. Olimpia
 Fuerte San Francisco

See also
Ciutat de Tarragona Trophy

References

External links

Official website 
Futbolme team profile 
Soccerway.com team profile 

 
Football clubs in Catalonia
Association football clubs established in 1914
1914 establishments in Spain
Segunda División clubs
La Liga clubs
Primera Federación clubs
Sport in Tarragona